Konstantin Aleksandrovich Fedin (– 15 July 1977) was a Soviet and Russian novelist and literary functionary.

Biography
Born in Saratov of humble origins, Fedin studied in Moscow and Germany and was interned there during World War I. After his release, he worked as an interpreter in the first Soviet embassy in Berlin. On returning to Russia, he joined the Bolsheviks and served in the Red Army. After leaving the Party in 1921, he joined the literary group called the Serapion Brothers, who supported the Revolution, but wanted freedom for literature and the arts.

His first story, "The Orchard," was published in 1922, as was his play Bakunin v Drezdene (Bakunin in Dresden). His first two novels are his most important; Goroda i gody (1924; tr. as Cities and Years, 1962, "one of the first major novels in Soviet literature") and Bratya (Brothers, 1928) both deal with the problems of intellectuals at the time of the October Revolution, and include "impressions of the German bourgeois world" based on his wartime imprisonment.

His later novels include Pokhishchenie Evropy (The rape of Europe, 1935), Sanatorii Arktur (The Arktur sanatorium, 1939), and the historical trilogy, Pervye radosti (First joys, 1945), Neobyknovennoe leto (An unusual summer, 1948), and Kostyor (The Fire, 1961–67). He also wrote a memoir Gorky sredi nas (Gorky among us, 1943). Edward J. Brown sums him up as follows: "Fedin, while he is probably not a great writer, did possess in a high degree the talent for communicating the atmosphere of a particular time and place. His best writing is reminiscent re-creation of his own experiences, and his memory is able to select and retain sensuous elements of long-past scenes which render their telling a rich experience."

From 1959 until his death in 1977, he served as chair of the Union of Soviet Writers.

Awards
 Hero of Socialist Labour (1967)
 Four Orders of Lenin
 Order of the Red Banner of Labour, twice
 Order of the October Revolution
 Stalin Prize, 1st class (1949) - for the novel "First Joy" (1945) and "No Ordinary Summer" (1947-1948)
 Order of the GDR, twice

English Translations
No Ordinary Summer, 2 vols, Foreign Languages Publishing House, Moscow, 1950.
Sanatorium Arktur, Foreign Languages Publishing House, Moscow, 1957.
Early Joys, Vintage, 1960.
The Conflagration, Progress Publishers, Moscow, 1968.
Cities and Years, Northwestern University Press, 1993.

References

Sources
 Encyclopædia Britannica
 A.K. Thorlby (ed.), The Penguin Companion to Literature: European (Penguin, 1969).

External links
 http://www.spartacus-educational.com/RUSfedin.htm
 http://www.sovlit.net/bios/fedin.html

1892 births
1977 deaths
20th-century Russian male writers
Bolsheviks
Burials at Novodevichy Cemetery
Eighth convocation members of the Supreme Soviet of the Soviet Union
Full Members of the USSR Academy of Sciences
Heroes of Socialist Labour
Ninth convocation members of the Supreme Soviet of the Soviet Union
Writers from Saratov
Recipients of the Order of Lenin
Recipients of the Order of the Red Banner of Labour
Recipients of the Patriotic Order of Merit in gold
Russian male novelists
Russian male poets
Russian male short story writers
Seventh convocation members of the Supreme Soviet of the Soviet Union
Sixth convocation members of the Supreme Soviet of the Soviet Union
Soviet male writers
Soviet novelists
Soviet poets
Soviet short story writers
Stalin Prize winners